Andre Dow (known by his stage name Mac Minister) is a former American rapper.

Mac Minister was profiled on an episode of America's Most Wanted, allegedly responsible for the murder of Anthony "Fat-Tone" Watkins in Las Vegas, Nevada, in retaliation for the murder of Bay Area hip-hop icon Mac Dre. After a 10-month manhunt, Mac was apprehended by Andrew Thirlaway on the evening of March 2, 2006 while hiding out in a San Francisco apartment, becoming AMW Direct Result Capture #879.

Mac Minister is from San Francisco, California, the Fillmore District - a neighborhood also known as "The Fillmore", "FILLMOE", and "the Moe". He lived in the Marcus Garvey/Martin Luther King Jr housing complex and his apartment was entered in two police raids in 1999, one in which his pitbull was shot and killed by the police officers.

Homicide charges 

Dow was convicted along with his friend Jason "Corleone" Mathis of two counts of first-degree murder and two counts of conspiracy to commit murder. The trial lasted less than a week.  Both men received sentences of life without parole.

The bodies of the victims were later found riddled with AK-47 bullets at a construction site outside of Las Vegas. MGM Grand security cameras documented Minister leaving the hotel with two men just hours before the slaying.

Police immediately sought to question him, but the veteran rapper went on the lam, prompting a 10-month manhunt. The case was featured prominently on America's Most Wanted before Mac's capture on March 2, 2006.

He was sentenced to life in prison without the possibility of parole on July 31, 2008.

New Trial 
On June 8, 2022 court documents were published online that reveal that Dow has been granted a new trial. This after a key prosecution witness against Dow by the name of Antione Mouton, recanted his testimony, stating that he made statements incriminating Dow in exchange for receiving favorable treatment for his own pending criminal cases.

Discography

Albums
2006: The Minister of Defense

Appearances
1994: Mac Minister featuring Mac Mall "West Coast"
1995: Mac Minister featuring Little Bruce & B-Legit "Rap Star"
1996: E-40 featuring Mac Minister "Mack Minister (Interlude)"
1999: Frost featuring B-Legit, Richie Rich & Mac Minister "Heart Of A Savage"
2000: Snoop Dogg featuring Mac Minister "Game Court"
2001: Turk featuring Mac Minister "Seattle Slew" (Skit) & "Police" (Skit)
2002: Yukmouth featuring Mac Minister "Fuck Friends"
2003: Ras Kass featuring Scipio, Donna Karin, 40 Glocc & Mac Minister "Don't Ask Me"
2006: Mac Minister "Fuck The Law"
2006: Mac Minister featuring Mac Dre "The Treal Man"
2006: The Game featuring Mac Minister "Lookin At You"
2010: Too Short featuring Richie Rich & Mac Minister "Ya'll Ready"

References

External links 
  Henry K. Lee, "Vallejo: Mystery over death of Mac Dre protege", San Francisco Chronicle, April 1, 2007
 Police Raid Zeroes In On Drug Turf War / 19 arrested in sweep of Western Addition
  Mariel Concepcion, "Rapper Mac Minister Preps for Murder Trial and New Album Release", Vibe.com, Aug. 22, 2006
  "Bay Area's Mac Minister Found, Ends 10-Month Manhunt", sohh.com, March 3, 2006
  Nolan Strong, "Police Seek To Question Rapper Mac Minister In Las Vegas Double Homicide", AllHipHop.com, May 26, 2005

African-American male rappers
American people convicted of murder
American prisoners sentenced to life imprisonment
Living people
People convicted of murder by Nevada
Prisoners sentenced to life imprisonment by Nevada
Rappers from the San Francisco Bay Area
Gangsta rappers
21st-century American rappers
21st-century American male musicians
Year of birth missing (living people)
21st-century African-American musicians